The 2022 Internationaux Féminins de la Vienne was a professional tennis tournament played on indoor hard courts. It was the twenty-eighth edition of the tournament which was part of the 2022 ITF Women's World Tennis Tour. It took place in Poitiers, France between 24 and 30 October 2022.

Champions

Singles

  Petra Marčinko def.  Ysaline Bonaventure, 6–3, 7–6(7–2)

Doubles

  Miriam Kolodziejová /  Markéta Vondroušová def.  Jessika Ponchet /  Renata Voráčová, 6–4, 6–3

Singles main draw entrants

Seeds

 1 Rankings are as of 17 October 2022.

Other entrants
The following players received wildcards into the singles main draw:
  Audrey Albié
  Loïs Boisson
  Elsa Jacquemot
  Marine Partaud

The following player received entry into the singles main draw using a junior exempt:
  Petra Marčinko

The following players received entry from the qualifying draw:
  Alex Eala
  Yuliya Hatouka
  Isabella Kruger
  Conny Perrin
  Peangtarn Plipuech
  Iryna Shymanovich
  Anastasia Tikhonova
  Alice Tubello

The following player received entry as a lucky loser:
  Amandine Monnot

References

External links
 2022 Internationaux Féminins de la Vienne at ITFtennis.com
 Official website

2022 ITF Women's World Tennis Tour
2022 in French tennis
October 2022 sports events in France